Hubbard is an unincorporated community and census-designated place (CDP) in the western part of Hubbard Township, Hubbard County, Minnesota, United States. It is in southern Hubbard County, along Minnesota State Highway 87, at the outlet of Long Lake.

Hubbard was first listed as a CDP prior to the 2020 census.

Demographics

References 

Census-designated places in Hubbard County, Minnesota
Census-designated places in Minnesota